April Lawlor, known professionally as simply April, is an Irish pop singer and songwriter who was born in Dublin, raised in County Kildare, and is currently based out of London. She is signed to Atlantic Records.

Early life 
April was born in Dublin but moved to Kilcullen as a kid, when she was about to start school. She got into music from a young age, since her dad himself had always done music. She took piano lessons for a few months as a kid and can play the piano and the guitar, though she says she can't play either perfectly. April wrote songs throughout her childhood.

Career 
April began her music career by uploading songs to SoundCloud. In 2019 she went on tour with Alec Benjamin in Europe. In 2021 she signed to Atlantic Records.

Musical style 
In 2020, April Lawlor cited Lana Del Rey, Clairo, and King Princess as influences, and Lana Del Rey specifically as her favorite woman artist. Her songs have been described as introspective pop. In February 2022 she described FKA Twigs, Charli XCX, and The 1975 as additional influences. Having been a fan of Lady Gaga since childhood, April describes Lady Gaga and Charli XCX as inspirations in her childhood dream of becoming a popstar.

April's single Someone That I Made has been called "an ode to her rural Irish roots".

The show Euphoria inspired April as she made the storyboards for the music video to Piece of Me.

Discography

Extended plays

Singles

References 

Musicians from County Kildare
Irish pop singers
21st-century Irish women musicians
Year of birth missing (living people)
Living people